al-Majd is a Palestinian village located eighteen kilometers south-west of Hebron. The village is in the Hebron Governorate Southern West Bank.

History
Ceramics from the Byzantine era have been found here.

Ottoman era
In 1863, Victor Guérin called it Khirbet Medjed. 

In 1883  the  PEF's Survey of Palestine  found here "Caves, cisterns, and pillar shafts; a ruined chapel seems to have stood there".

1948-1967
In the wake of the 1948 Arab–Israeli War, and after the 1949 Armistice Agreements, Al-Majd came under Jordanian rule.

The Jordanian census of 1961 found 466 inhabitants in  Al-Majd.

1967-present
After the Six-Day War in 1967,  Al-Majd  has been under Israeli occupation.

According to the Palestinian Central Bureau of Statistics, the village had a population of 1,925 in 2007.

References

Bibliography

External links
Welcome To Khirbat al-Majd
Survey of Western Palestine, Map 21:    IAA, Wikimedia commons
Al Majd Village (Fact Sheet), Applied Research Institute–Jerusalem (ARIJ)
 Al Majd Village Profile, ARIJ
Al Majd Village Area Photo, ARIJ
The priorities and needs for development in Al Majd village based on the community and local authorities’ assessment, ARIJ

Villages in the West Bank
Hebron Governorate
Municipalities of the State of Palestine